Wrangbrook Junction near Upton in West Yorkshire was a location where two lines branched off the Hull and Barnsley Railway main line from  to . The line between Hull and Cudworth had opened on 20 July 1885, the branch to Denaby on 1 September 1894 and the one to Wath on 31 March 1902.

Originally three signal boxes controlled the junctions: "Wrangbrook North" on the south side of the main line by the Denaby branch; "Wrangbrook South" on the west side of the Denaby branch and "Wrangbrook West" on the west side of the Wath branch. In 1934 South and West boxes were closed and control passed to North box which was renamed "Wrangbrook Junction".

The line between Wrangbrook Junction and Little Weighton was closed on 6 April 1959. The section from Moorhouse to Wrangbrook Junction followed on 30 September 1963), and the lines between Wrangbrook Junction and  Monckton and Sprotborough both closed on 7 August 1967.

References 

Railways in South Yorkshire C.T. Goode. Dalesman publishing, 1975.

External links 
 Wrangbrook junction on navigable 1955 O. S. map

 

Rail transport in West Yorkshire
Hull and Barnsley Railway